Stanley Heptinstall  (born 21 August 1946) is an Emeritus Professor of the University of Nottingham, Director of Platelet Solutions Ltd (a spinout company of the University of Nottingham), and local government councillor on Nottinghamshire County Council.

Previously he was professor of Thrombosis and Haemostasis at the University of Nottingham, retiring in 2011. Professor Heptinstall served as Head of the Division of Cardiovascular Medicine in the School of Clinical Sciences, Faculty of Medicine and Health Sciences.

He has been a local government councillor for 25 years, serving on Broxtowe Borough Council and Nottinghamshire County Council. He retired as a borough councillor in 2015, having served as the Mayor of the Borough of Broxtowe in the year 2014/15.

Early life 
Stan Heptinstall was born in Bolton, Lancashire, son of Stanley Heptinstall and Florence Heptinstall (née Hampson). He has a sister Brenda, born in 1950. The family moved to St Annes-on-Sea when he was 8 years old.

Education 
His primary education (aged 8–11 years) was mainly in St Annes-on-Sea. His secondary education was at Ansdell Secondary Modern School (11–13 years) followed by King Edward VII School, Lytham St Annes (13–17 years). Heptinstall pursued undergraduate studies at the University of Newcastle upon Tyne between 1964 and 1967 and graduated with a first class degree in chemistry. He then successfully obtained a Science Research Council studentship to study for a PhD in the Microbiological Chemistry Research Laboratory at the University of Newcastle upon Tyne working with Professor Ron Archibald, who was his supervisor, and Sir Jim Baddiley, who was the head of the laboratory and of the Department of Chemistry. Following this period of research, he obtained an Imperial Chemical Industries Postdoctoral Research Fellowship to continue his studies on the structure and function of teichoic acids in bacterial cell walls. It was during this time that he published his first scientific papers.

Professional career 
In 1971, Heptinstall sought a change in his academic direction and secured a two-year postdoctoral fellowship to study blood platelets in the newly established Faculty of Medicine in the University of Nottingham. He focused his research on the role of platelets in thrombosis and haemostasis under the mentorship of Professor Tony Mitchell, DPhil, FRCP, who was the foundation professor of Medicine at the University of Nottingham. Over subsequent years he was awarded a non-clinical lecturership, progressed to Senior Lecturer and then became a Reader in Thrombosis and Haemostasis. He was awarded a personal chair in 1985, and gained the title of professor of Thrombosis and Haemostasis.

For many years Professor Heptinstall was the main coordinator of the Clinical Sciences Homebase which contributes to the delivery of teaching for medical students studying for the Bachelor of Medical Sciences at the University of Nottingham, while continuing with his own research as the Head of the Thrombosis and Haemostasis research group in the Division of Cardiovascular Medicine. Following the retirement of Professor Bob Wilcox, FRCP in 2009, Professor Heptinstall was appointed Head of the Department of Cardiovascular Medicine in the School of Clinical Sciences at the University of Nottingham Medical School. He was instrumental in mentoring undergraduate and postgraduate students, postdoctoral scientists, and clinicians from the affiliated Nottingham University Hospitals NHS Trust who undertook periods of research in the Faculty of Medicine and Health Sciences.

For 25 years he served as the Editor-in-Chief of the scientific journal Platelets (1990–2014). In March 2015 the new editors produced a special issue of the journal in honour of his contribution to the journal and also to highlight his scientific achievements. For many years he also served on the editorial boards of a number of scientific journals including the Journal of Thrombosis and Haemostasis.

Heptinstall is an active member of the International Society on Thrombosis and Haemostasis and is a past secretary and president the British Society for Haemostasis and Thrombosis. He was a founder member of the European Platelet Group which included working with and encouraging scientists in Europe, and especially through the organisation of conferences on platelets, many of which were held in Erfurt in the former German Democratic Republic.

Research 
Professor Heptinstall was head of the Thrombosis and Haemostasis Research Group based in the Queen's Medical Centre, Nottingham for many years, where he engaged in extensive basic and clinical research aimed at understanding the function of platelets and other blood cells in physiological and pathological disease processes. The group has collaborated vastly with the pharmaceutical industry to identify and assess emerging pharmacological agents, as well as conducting clinical trials and studying existing drugs on their actions as antithrombotic agents in patients. A major part of Professor Heptinstall's research was concerned with finding ways through which platelet function can be modified to avoid thrombotic events like myocardial infarction and stroke. Over his career, Professor Heptinstall has published over 200 scientific papers in peer-reviewed journals in the fields of platelet research, thrombosis and haemostasis.

Platelet function testing 
The Thombosis and Haemostasis Group at the University of Nottingham, under Professor Heptinstall's direction, have identified a variety of test systems for evaluating the function of platelets and other blood cells before and during drug administration. This has led to the development of simple-to-use platelet function testing methods that can be used in any clinical setting, as a means of monitoring the success of drug therapy in patients. Professor Heptinstall is now the director of a University of Nottingham spinout company named Platelet Solutions Ltd. Platelet function testing in the clinical setting has the potential to enable personalised treatment of cardiac and stroke patients to ensure optimal therapy. More recently, simple-to-use means of detecting platelet dysfunction in people with pathological bruising and bleeding are nearing the final stages of development.

Political career 
Heptinstall pursued another career in local government. He was first elected to represent Bramcote Ward on Broxtowe Borough Council in 1991, and continued to represent his local community until he retired as a borough councillor in May 2015. He is a Liberal Democrat and served as the Cabinet Member for the Environment at Broxtowe Borough Council until he became the Deputy Mayor. He served his final year as a borough councillor as the Mayor of the Borough of Broxtowe (2014/15). As well as being a borough councillor, Professor Heptinstall is a county councillor and represents Bramcote and Stapleford Division on Nottinghamshire County Council. He was first elected to Nottinghamshire County Council in 1997. For many years he was also a member of Stapleford Town Council. He stood as the Liberal Democrat candidate for Derbyshire Police and Crime Commissioner in the 2021 election, but was eliminated in the first round of voting.

Community activities 
Heptinstall chairs the group that organises a major community event known as the Hemlock Happening, which annually attracts approximately 10,000 people to Bramcote Hills Park for a day of festivities and leisure. For many years he was the chair of the Bramcote Community Action Team. He is a former governor and now a director of the White Hills Park Academy Trust, which provides secondary education in the Bramcote area. He is a trustee of several local charities including Fundays and Beeston Shopmobility. Heptinstall is also a deputy warden at his local parish church, St Michael's Church. He is a member of the parochial church council and also sings in the choir at St Michael's. He is a co-editor of the publication 'Focus on Bramcote', which is delivered regularly to residents of the Bramcote area.

In 1997, Heptinstall was made a Member of the Order of the British Empire (MBE) by Queen Elizabeth II in recognition of his extensive community activities. The citation was: “for services to the people of Bramcote in the county of Nottinghamshire”.

In 2015, Heptinstall became a Trustee of SW Notts District Scout Council and in 2016 was appointed Chair of the Board of Trustees.

Family life 
Heptinstall has lived in an area of Bramcote known as Bramcote Hills since 1975. His wife, the Reverend Canon Lillian Heptinstall is an ordained priest in the Church of England. They have four children.

References

External links 

 

1946 births
Living people
People from Bolton
People educated at King Edward VII and Queen Mary School
Alumni of Newcastle University
Mayors of places in Nottinghamshire
Academics of the University of Nottingham
Members of the Order of the British Empire
People from Bramcote
Liberal Democrats (UK) councillors
Liberal Democrats (UK) mayors